Neil Rollinson (born 1960 West Yorkshire) is a British poet.

Life
He has published four collections of poetry, all Poetry Book Society Recommendations (Jonathan Cape UK). His last collection Talking Dead was shortlisted for the Costa Poetry Award. He has published several pamphlets, the last of which, also titled Talking Dead was shortlisted for the Michael Marks award.  He was writer in residence at Wordsworth’s Dove Cottage for two years and has since been teaching creative writing at Bath Spa University.

He was 2007 writer-in-residence at Manchester's Centre For New Writing.

He tutors occasionally at the Arvon Centre. and works regularly with mentees on poetry projects.

Awards
 1997 First Prize, UK National Poetry Competition
 Royal Literary Fund Fellow
 2005 Cholmondeley Award
 2015 Shortlist: Costa Poetry Prize.

Works
 
 
 
 "Constellations"; "Entropy", Nox Oculis
 "The Ecstasy of St Saviours Avenue"

 chapbook

References

External links
 "Author's website"
 "Interview: Neil Rollinson", Pomegranate, Issue 5

1960 births
Living people
Alumni of Newcastle University
British poets
People from West Yorkshire
British male poets
Writers from Yorkshire